The 2005–06 Toto Cup Artzit was the 7th time the cup was being contested. The final was played at Herzliya Municipal Stadium on 17 January 2006.

The winners were Hapoel Ramat Gan, beating Maccabi Ironi Tirat HaCarmel 2–0 in the final.

Group stage

Group A

Group B

Semi-finals
{| class="wikitable" style="text-align: center"
|-
!Home Team
!Score
!Away Team
|-

Final

See also
 Toto Cup
 2005–06 Liga Artzit
 2005–06 in Israeli football

References
 2005/2006 Artzit Toto Cup IFA 
 Highlights per season HaMakhtesh 

Toto Cup Artzit
Toto Cup Artzit
Israel Toto Cup Artzit